This is a list of notable events in Latin music (music from the Spanish- and Portuguese-speaking areas of Latin America, Europe, and the United States) that took place in 1990.

Events 
January 10 – EMI Latin bought Bob Grever's Cara Records, beginning the golden age of Tejano music.
February 21 – The 32nd Annual Grammy Awards are held at the Shrine Auditorium in Los Angeles, California.
José Feliciano wins the Grammy Award for Best Latin Pop Performance for his rendition of "Cielito Lindo"
Ray Barretto and Celia Cruz wins the Grammy Award for Best Tropical Performance for their album Ritmo en el Corazón
Los Lobos wins the Grammy Award for Best Mexican-American Performance for their album La Pistola y El Corazón.
 February 10"Lambada" by French-Brazilian group Kaoma becomes the first non Spanish-language song to top the Billboard Hot Latin Tracks chart. The song is performed entirely in Portuguese.
 May 23Billboard commences its first ever Latin Music Conference at the Hyatt Hotel in Miami, Florida.
 May 24 – The 3rd Annual Lo Nuestro Awards are held at the James L. Knight Center in Miami, Florida. Nicaraguan singer Luis Enrique is the most awarded artist with three wins.

Bands formed

Bands reformed

Bands disbanded

Bands on hiatus

Number-ones albums and singles by country 
List of number-one albums of 1990 (Spain)
List of number-one singles of 1990 (Spain)
List of number-one Billboard Top Latin Albums of 1990
List of number-one Billboard Hot Latin Tracks of 1990

Awards 
1990 Premio Lo Nuestro
1990 Tejano Music Awards

Albums released

First quarter

January

February

March

Second quarter

April

May

June

Third quarter

July

May

August

September

Fourth quarter

October

November

December

Dates unknown

Best-selling records

Best-selling albums
The following is a list of the top 5 best-selling Latin albums of 1990 in the United States in the categories of Latin pop, Regional Mexican, and Tropical/salsa, according to Billboard.

Best-performing songs
The following is a list of the top 10 best-performing Latin songs in the United States in 1990, according to Billboard.

Births 
January 5Darell, Puerto Rican rapper
January 30 – Eiza González, Mexican actress and singer
February 17 – María José Quintanilla, Chilean singer
March 17 – Alice Caymmi, Brazilian singer
March 29Justin Quiles, Colombian reggaeton singer
July 17 – Naëla, Colombian pop singer
August 11 – María José Castillo, Costa Rican pop singer
August 24 – Juan Pedro Lanzani, Argentine pop singer and actor, former member of Teen Angels
September 25Edén Muñoz, Mexican performer of banda music
October 7Dalex, Argentine singer
October 20 – Melody, Spanish pop singer
November 29 – Diego Boneta, Mexican singer and actor
December 28 – , Mexican singer and actress

Deaths 
May 16–Eduardo Mateo, Uruguayan singer, songwriter, guitarist and arranger
July 7–Cazuza, Brazilian singer and songwriter, former member of Barão Vermelho
October 27–Xavier Cugat, Spanish-American bandleader 
October 28–Gervasio, Uruguayan new wave singer
December 14–Francisco Gabilondo Soler, Mexican singer and creator of Cri-Cri

References 

 
Latin music by year